Narendra Dev Verma was an Indian music composer and father in law of Bhupesh Baghel whose song Arpa Pairi Ke Dhar adopted as State Song of Chhattisgarh.

Personal life 
He was born on 4 November 1939 in Sevagram and died on 8 September 1979 in Raipur.

Honor 

He was tributed by Bhupesh Baghel, Chief Minister of Chhattisgarh in his death anniversary.

References 

1939 births
1979 deaths
Indian composers